Selwood used to be a village but is now part of the suburbs of Frome. It is a civil parish in the Mendip district of Somerset, England. The parish includes the villages of East and West Woodlands, Rodden and the hamlets of Alder Row and Blatchbridge.

History

Roddenbury Hillfort is a univallate Iron Age hill fort. It is a Scheduled Ancient Monument and on the Heritage at Risk Register.

The ancient Selwood Forest stretched approximately between Gillingham in Dorset and Chippenham in Wiltshire. Between the eighth and early eleventh centuries it was an important boundary between east and west Wessex, and in 705 the bishopric of Sherborn was established for those "west of Selwood" Only a few fragments of the forest now survive.

The parish was part of the hundred of Frome.

Governance

The parish council has responsibility for local issues, including setting an annual precept (local rate) to cover the council's operating costs and producing annual accounts for public scrutiny. The parish council evaluates local planning applications and works with the local police, district council officers, and neighbourhood watch groups on matters of crime, security, and traffic. The parish council's role also includes initiating projects for the maintenance and repair of parish facilities, as well as consulting with the district council on the maintenance, repair, and improvement of highways, drainage, footpaths, public transport, and street cleaning. Conservation matters (including trees and listed buildings) and environmental issues are also the responsibility of the council.

The village falls within the Non-metropolitan district of Mendip, which was formed on 1 April 1974 under the Local Government Act 1972, having previously been part of Frome Rural District, which is responsible for local planning and building control, local roads, council housing, environmental health, markets and fairs, refuse collection and recycling, cemeteries and crematoria, leisure services, parks, and tourism.

Somerset County Council is responsible for running the largest and most expensive local services such as education, social services, libraries, main roads, public transport, policing and  fire services, trading standards, waste disposal and strategic planning.

It is also part of the Somerton and Frome county constituency represented in the House of Commons of the Parliament of the United Kingdom. It elects one Member of Parliament (MP) by the first past the post system of election.

Landmarks

Manor Farmhouse in West Woodlands provides a particularly good survival of 17th century interior features in a very fine state of preservation, while St. Algars Farmhouse (named after Ælfgar of Selwood) dates from the 14th century. In Rodden the Manor House dates from the late 16th century.

Religious sites

The Church of All Saints in Rodden dates from 1640, and was rebuilt in the mid 19th century.

The church in East Woodlands was completed in 1714 having been paid for by the Longleat estate, then patrons of the parish. It is now dedicated to St Katharine. It was extensively restored in the 1870s by Pearson, the architect who also designed Truro Cathedral.

References

External links

 Rode First School, Somerset

Villages in Mendip District
Civil parishes in Somerset